Naya Daur may refer to:
 Naya Daur (1957 film)
 Naya Daur (1978 film)
 Naya Daur (magazine), a literary magazine published by Lucknow